Antônio Benedito da Silva (born March 23, 1965), nicknamed Toninho, is a former Brazilian football player who played for Portuguesa (Brazil), Guarani (Brazil), Yomiuri (Japan), Shimizu S-Pulse (Japan), Urawa Red Diamonds (Japan) and Vasco da Gama (Brazil). He played for the Brazil national team one time.

Club statistics

National team statistics

Honors
 Japan Soccer League Top Scorer: 1991-92 with 18 goals in 22 games
 Japan Soccer League Best Eleven: 1991-92

Trivia
 His younger brother is Sonny Anderson.

References

External links

 

1965 births
Living people
Brazilian footballers
Brazilian expatriate footballers
Japan Soccer League players
J1 League players
Tokyo Verdy players
Shimizu S-Pulse players
Urawa Red Diamonds players
Associação Portuguesa de Desportos players
Guarani FC players
CR Vasco da Gama players
Expatriate footballers in Japan
Association football forwards
Brazil international footballers